Pauline Wong (born 23 November 1985) is a former professional Dutch tennis player.

She won eight ITF titles in her career- four apiece in singles and doubles. Her highest singles ranking was world No. 323, which she achieved on 28 January 2008. Wong participated at the Odense Open in 2008, but lost in the first round.

ITF Circuit finals

Singles: 7 (4 titles, 3 runner-ups)

Doubles: 5 (4 titles, 1 runner-up)

External links
 
 
 

1985 births
Living people
Dutch female tennis players
People from Vlaardingen
Sportspeople from South Holland
20th-century Dutch women
21st-century Dutch women